Yuliya Igorevna Skokova (born 1 December 1982) is a Russian speed skater. She lives in Yekaterinburg. She competed at the 2014 Winter Olympics in Sochi, where she placed eighth in 3000 meters.

Personal records

References

External links
 

1982 births
Living people
Speed skaters at the 2014 Winter Olympics
Russian female speed skaters
Olympic speed skaters of Russia
Medalists at the 2014 Winter Olympics
Olympic medalists in speed skating
Olympic bronze medalists for Russia
World Single Distances Speed Skating Championships medalists
Universiade gold medalists for Russia
Universiade medalists in speed skating
Speed skaters at the 2007 Winter Universiade
Universiade silver medalists for Russia
Medalists at the 2007 Winter Universiade